Valles (singular vallis) on Mars are similar to valleys on Earth. Some features that take this title may be better described as canyons or chasmata; see List of Chasmata on Mars. Coordinates are given as planetocentric latitude with east longitude. Large valles are named for the words for "Mars" or "star" in various languages, while small ones are named for rivers.

References

External links
 Planetary Names/usgs
 Mars Atlas

Mars